This is the complete list of European Pairs Speedway Championship medalists from 2004 to 2014.

Medalists

See also 
 motorcycle speedway
 List of Speedway World Pairs Championship medalists

!
Speedway Pairs European Championships